Ukraine competed at the 2006 Winter Olympics in Turin, Italy.

Medalists

Competitors
The following is the list of number of competitors participating at the Games per sport/discipline.

Alpine skiing

Mykola Skriabin managed to qualify and compete in each of the five men's disciplines, with his top finish a 26th in the giant slalom.

Note: In the men's combined, run 1 is the downhill, and runs 2 and 3 are the slalom. In the women's combined, run 1 and 2 are the slalom, and run 3 the downhill.

Biathlon 

Lilia Efremova, who had failed to finish in the top 30 in any event at the 2005 World Championships,   shot perfectly and survived a relatively slow finish to earn a bronze medal in the women's sprint.

Men

Women

Cross-country skiing 

Twelve skiers represented Ukraine in Turin, the largest delegation in any sport. The top finish came from Valentina Shevchenko in the women's 30 kilometre freestyle; she had the fastest time at the 20 kilometre mark, but fell off the pace to end up 7th.

Distance

Men

Women

Sprint

Figure skating 

Elena Grushina and Ruslan Goncharov, the 2005 World Championship bronze medalists, earned the same result in Turin, rallying from a poor start to end up in 3rd.

Key: CD = Compulsory Dance, FD = Free Dance, FS = Free Skate, OD = Original Dance, SP = Short Program

Freestyle skiing 

Ukraine sent seven athletes to compete in the freestyle skiing events, specifically men's and women's aerials, but only one, Enver Ablaev, managed to qualify for a final.

Luge 

The doubles team of  Oleg Zherebetskyy and Roman Yazvinskyy, who finished 19th in the first run of the event, pulled out after suffering a serious crash. Yazvinskyy was air-lifted to hospital with a head injury, but he remained conscious and was released the next day.

Nordic combined 

Sergei Diyachuk and Volodymyr Trachuk both finished in the bottom five in the two Nordic combined events in Turin.

Note: 'Deficit' refers to the amount of time behind the leader a competitor began the cross-country portion of the event. Italicized numbers show the final deficit from the winner's finishing time.

Short track speed skating 

Volodymyr Grygoriev, Ukraine's only speed skater in Turin, advanced from his heat in the 1000 metres, but then finished last in his quarterfinal.

Ski jumping 

Ukraine's lone competing ski jumper, Volodymyr Boschuk, did not progress beyond the qualification round in either the normal or large hill events.

References

Nations at the 2006 Winter Olympics
2006
Winter Olympics